Dan Lovén (26 February 1961 – 26 September 2019) was a Swedish sailor. He competed in the 470 event at the 1984 Summer Olympics.

References

External links
 

1961 births
2019 deaths
Swedish male sailors (sport)
Olympic sailors of Sweden
Sailors at the 1984 Summer Olympics – 470
Sportspeople from Gothenburg